Cesar Ruba Catli Jr. is a Filipino professional basketball player for the Cebu City Sharks of the Maharlika Pilipinas Basketball League (MPBL). He was picked by the Sta. Lucia Realtors tenth overall in the 2005 PBA draft.

PBA career statistics

Season-by-season averages

|-
| align=left | 
| align=left | Sta. Lucia
| 37 || 15.1 || .324 || .291 || .700 || 1.8 || .4 || .3 || .1 || 4.0
|-
| align=left | 
| align=left | Sta. Lucia
| 39 || 9.3 || .328 || .319 || .714 || 1.4 || .1 || .2 || .1 || 3.0
|-
| align=left | 
| align=left | Coca-Cola
| 27 || 18.0 || .374 || .316 || .733 || 2.9 || .4 || .3 || .1 || 6.7
|-
| align=left | 
| align=left | Coca-Cola
| 14 || 15.3 || .333 || .315 || .000 || 2.7 || .5 || .1 || .1 || 4.2
|-
| align=left | 
| align=left | Coca-Cola
| 5 || 16.6 || .182 || .000 || .000 || 1.8 || .0 || .4 || .2 || 1.6
|-
| align=left | Career
| align=left |
| 122 || 14.0 || .336 || .301 || .676 || 2.0 || .3 || .3 || .1 || 4.2

References

Filipino men's basketball players
Living people
1982 births
People from Bukidnon
FEU Tamaraws basketball players
Basketball players from Bukidnon
Shooting guards
Sta. Lucia Realtors players
Powerade Tigers players
Maharlika Pilipinas Basketball League players
Sta. Lucia Realtors draft picks